Crayons to Computers (C2C) is a non-profit free school supply store for teachers who work at schools in the 15-county area of greater Cincinnati. Founded in 1997, C2C operates a  retail store and warehouse where teachers can obtain stationery, educational tools and incentive items at no charge.  The 501 (c)(3) supports teachers from over 400 schools in the Cincinnati area.

C2C has several programs which generate products for teachers and needy students. 
 
Crafts with Conviction is a collaboration with the Ohio Department of Rehabilitation and Correction. Volunteer inmates at 21 prisons in Ohio manufacture educational tools out of raw materials. Crafts with Conviction produces 25% of the products at C2C, including flash cards, maps, tote bags, pocketed chair covers, and writing journals, among others. Many of the items are made from donated resources.

Push for Pencils is C2C's annual back-to-school supply drive to generate support from the community so that children in the Cincinnati region can return to school with adequate supplies. Participants collect new school supplies, such as crayons, glue, paper and notebooks, and donate them in collection bins at their companies or community organizations. Kroger, Staples and CVS stores also participate in the collection.

Keep Our Kids Warm collects and provides handmade hats, scarves and mittens donated by knitters and crocheters for teachers to distribute to students who need them in the winter. Non-crafters may assist by donating money to purchase yarn.

Crayons to Computers is a member of the Kids In Need Foundation’s national network of free stores. During the 2008/2009 school year, C2C distributed more than $11 million worth of items to teachers. The non-profit accepts donations of new and used items, such as binders, children's books, and craft supplies.

External links
Official website

Education in Cincinnati